Luceafărul Theatre may refer to:

Luceafărul Theatre (Iași), for children and youth, in Iași, Romania, founded in 1949
Luceafărul Theatre (Chișinău), in Chișinău, Moldova, founded in 1960

See also
Luceafărul (disambiguation)